Lufthansa Systems is an information technology service provider for the aviation industry. It has around 2,200 employees in several locations in Germany and offices in 16 other countries.  The company is headquartered in Raunheim near Frankfurt.  The company's portfolio includes "consulting, development and implementation of customized industry solutions as well as the operation of applications in the company's own data centers."

In March 2015, Lufthansa Systems undertook a reorganization to reform into three operating units: Infrastructure, Airline Solutions (now known as "Lufthansa Systems") and Industry Solutions (now "Lufthansa Industry Solutions").  The Infrastructure unit, which employs about 1,400 people, has been sold to IBM, while the other two units were meant to remain as subsidiaries of the parent company Lufthansa.

The Hungarian subsidiary, Lufthansa Systems Hungária Kft., was established in 1995 and employed 200 people as of 2005.

History
In 1995, Lufthansa Systems (LIDO) was established to turn the Lufthansa Group's IT department into a legally independent company.

In 2013, Lufthansa Systems AG, with around 2,700 employees worldwide, achieved annual sales of 640 million euros, of which 265 million euros came from outside the Lufthansa Group.

In 2015, the company sold its IT infrastructure division, "which provides data centres, networks and telephony" to IBM.

In November 2017, Lufthansa Systems GmbH & Co. KG began moving to a newly built headquarters in the Airport Garden business park in Raunheim, near Frankfurt Airport.

References

External links
 Lufthansa Systems homepage

Lufthansa
Software companies of Germany
Information technology consulting firms of Germany
German companies established in 1995
Software companies established in 1995